Wario Land 3 is a platform game developed and published by Nintendo for the Game Boy Color. In the game, Mario's archrival Wario must free a mysterious figure who is trapped inside a music box. It was followed by Wario Land 4 in 2001. It was also released for the Nintendo 3DS Virtual Console in 2013. It was released as part of the Nintendo Switch Online service on 8 February 2023.

Gameplay
The gameplay in Wario Land 3 is very similar to that of its predecessor, Wario Land II. Wario must take advantage of his enemies' attacks to physically change and access new areas. For example, if Wario eats a donut thrown by a certain enemy, he temporarily bulks up to twice his size, giving him extra protection against attacks and the ability to break certain blocks. While Wario will always be affected by his enemies, he must also find new powers and abilities in order to progress through the game.

The world of the music box is divided into four different areas, East, West, North, and South, each containing a number of individual stages. Each stage contains four treasures, each of which is locked in a colored treasure chest that can only be opened with the corresponding key. The colors of the chests are, in the approximate order that they are intended to be opened, Gray, Red, Green, and Blue. This order is not fixed, although the game provides hints as to the next stage to travel to and the next treasure to obtain. Often, when a treasure chest in one stage cannot be reached, Wario must backtrack to retrieve a new item to make it accessible.

Finding new treasures usually opens a path to a new stage, or unlocks a new area in a previous stage. Some treasures grant Wario a new ability, allowing him to access previously unreachable areas. Whenever Wario obtains a new treasure, he is transported back to the music box overworld. Time alternates between day or night each time Wario exits a stage. Some stages change depending on the time of day; certain enemies may be replaced or different paths may open up. Wario cannot control time initially, but gains this ability when he finds a certain treasure.

In some stages, Wario will have to play a golfing minigame to progress. He must knock the enemy into the cup without going over par for that hole, while avoiding hazards such as water, bunkers, lava and rough. Upon collecting certain items in the game, this golf minigame is available to be played at any time from the overworld map.

Coins can be found in each stage, and are used primarily to play the golfing minigame described above. Wario can carry a maximum of 999 coins. In addition, eight Music Coins are hidden in each level for Wario to find. If all eight are found in each of the 25 stages, an extra fourth golf hole will be available for play.

As in the previous Wario Land game, Wario has no health points and cannot die; the lone exception is that he can get captured by the game's final boss, Rudy the Clown and get a game over. This simply returns Wario back to the music box overworld.

Plot
One day, Wario's plane stalls and crashes while he is flying over the woods. Uninjured, he spends the rest of his afternoon wandering amongst the trees and underbrush until he stumbles upon a mysterious cave. Inside the cave, he discovers a magical music box and is suddenly sucked into it. There, a mysterious figure informs Wario that he had once ruled the world inside the music box, until an evil being sealed away his magical powers in five music boxes. In exchange for freeing it, the being promises to send Wario back to his own world and let him keep any treasure he finds. Enticed by the thought of returning to his own world with a cache of treasure, Wario departs on his quest, in search of the music boxes and the many treasures of this mysterious land.

After collecting all the music boxes, Wario returns to the mysterious being's temple. The music boxes play a medley together that frees the being, revealed to be Rudy the Clown. It transpires that Rudy is in fact the villain and had been imprisoned, although not before turning the music box's inhabitants into monsters, who had been attacking Wario simply to try to stop him from freeing the evil clown. After Wario defeats Rudy, he is met by the inhabitants of the music box, now restored to their former selves. They thank Wario and transport him back to his own world, along with the treasure that he has collected, as promised.

Reception

Wario Land 3 received highly positive reviews upon release. It has an aggregate score of 90.00% on GameRankings based on 15 reviews, making it the highest rated game in the Wario series. It was a runner-up for GameSpots annual "Best Game Boy Color Game" and "Best Platform Game" awards, losing to Dragon Warrior I & II and Banjo-Tooie, respectively. 

GameSpot rated the game 9.8 out of 10 and stated, "As far as platformers go, Wario Land 3 is a game that fires on all cylinders." IGN gave it an "outstanding" rating of 9 out of 10. Nintendo Power listed it as the ninth best Game Boy/Game Boy Color video game, describing it as the pinnacle of titular character Wario's early action-platform adventure games. Nintendojo awarded the game a perfect 10 out of 10, declaring that "This is simply one of the best portable games ever made. It'll suck away hours of your time and leave you begging for more. No gamer should go without an experience like this."

It was the tenth best selling Game Boy Color game in Japan, with 255,536 copies sold.

Notes

References

External links
 Official website (in Japanese)
 

2000 video games
Game Boy Color games
Metroidvania games
Nintendo Research & Development 1 games
Nintendo Switch Online games
Video game sequels
Video games developed in Japan
Virtual Console games
Virtual Console games for Nintendo 3DS
Wario Land
Single-player video games